The 2006 Atlantic Coast Conference baseball tournament was held at the Baseball Grounds of Jacksonville in Jacksonville, Florida, from May 24 through 28.  Clemson won the tournament and earned the Atlantic Coast Conference's automatic bid to the 2006 NCAA Division I baseball tournament. This was the last edition of the tournament to use the double-elimination format. The ACC converted the tournament to a round robin format in 2007.

Seeding Procedure
From TheACC.com:
The top two teams from both the Atlantic and Coastal divisions, as determined by conference winning percentage, in addition to the four teams with the next best conference winning percentage, regardless of division, will be selected to participate in the ACC Baseball Championship. The two division champions will automatically be seeded number one and two based on winning percentage in overall conference competition. The remaining teams will be seeded (three through eight) based on winning percentage in overall conference competition without regard to division. All ties will be broken using the tie-breaking provisions .

Boston College, Duke, Maryland and Virginia Tech did not make the tournament.

Tournament

All-Tournament Team

See also
College World Series
NCAA Division I Baseball Championship

References

TheACC.com 2006 Baseball Championship Info

Tournament
Atlantic Coast Conference baseball tournament
Atlantic Coast Conference baseball tournament
Atlantic Coast Conference baseball tournament
21st century in Jacksonville, Florida
Baseball competitions in Jacksonville, Florida
College baseball tournaments in Florida